The seventh season of the American television drama series Homeland premiered on February 11, 2018, and concluded on April 29, 2018, on Showtime, consisting of 12 episodes. The series started as a loosely based variation of the two-season run of the Israeli television series  (English: Prisoners of War) created by Gideon Raff and is developed for American television by Howard Gordon and Alex Gansa.

Plot
Carrie has left her job in the White House and is living with her sister Maggie. She takes on the Keane administration to secure the release of the 200 members of the intelligence community who were arrested under President Keane's orders the previous season.

Cast and characters

Main

 Claire Danes as Carrie Mathison, former CIA member and former White House advisor to President Keane now residing in Washington, D.C. with her sister Maggie
 Elizabeth Marvel as Elizabeth Keane, the current President of the United States
 Maury Sterling as Max Piotrowski, a freelance surveillance expert
 Linus Roache as David Wellington, White House Chief of Staff
 Jake Weber as Brett O'Keefe, TV host and provocateur
 Morgan Spector as Dante Allen, an FBI agent and old friend of Carrie’s who is looking into the hundreds of people President Keane has detained
 Mandy Patinkin as Saul Berenson, Carrie's former boss and mentor and the new National Security Advisor

Recurring
 Amy Hargreaves as Maggie Mathison, M.D., Carrie's sister
 Dylan Baker as Sam Paley, a maverick United States Senator from Arizona who is leading an aggressive investigation into the Keane administration
 Ellen Adair as Janet Bayne, Paley's Chief of Staff
 Mackenzie Astin as Bill Dunn, Carrie's brother-in-law who works for the Treasury Department
 Courtney Grosbeck as Josie Mathison-Dunn, Carrie's niece who is staunchly anti-Keane
 Lesli Margherita as Sharon Aldright, O'Keefe's assistant
 Claire and McKenna Keane as Frances "Franny" Mathison, Carrie and Brody's daughter
 Sandrine Holt as Simone Martin, Wellington's girlfriend and an undercover Russian military intelligence captain
 Matt Servitto as FBI Special Agent Maslin
 Sakina Jaffrey as Dr. Lori Meyer, Carrie's psychiatrist
 David Maldonado as Bo Elkins, who provides sanctuary to O'Keefe
 Colton Ryan as J.J. Elkins, Bo's son
 Costa Ronin as Lieutenant Colonel Yevgeny Gromov, a Russian GRU Senior Operations Officer
 James D'Arcy as Thomas Anson, a former special ops agent
 William Popp as Stein, a member of Thomas Anson's circle
 Clé Bennett as Dominique "Doxie" Marquis, also a member of Anson's circle
 Ari Fliakos as Carter Bennet, also a member of Anson's circle
 Catherine Curtin as Sandy Langmore, a former CIA officer, professor and member of Saul's task force
 Peter Vack as Clint Prower, a computer expert and a member of Saul's task force
 Beau Bridges as Vice President Ralph Warner
 Elya Baskin as Viktor Makarov, Ambassador of Russia to the United States
 Merab Ninidze as Colonel Sergei Mirov, Yevgeny's GRU superior
 Damian Young as Jim, head of the CIA's Moscow Station

Guest

 Robert Knepper as General Jamie McClendon
 Julee Cerda as Reiko Umon
 Barbara Rosenblat as Attorney General Hoberman
 Frederic Lehne as General Rossen
 Mark Ivanir as Ivan Krupin, a former Russian intelligence agent
 Jennifer Ferrin as Charlotte, a Russian agent
 Tricia Paoluccio as Audrey Navarro
 Thomas G. Waites as Clayton, a Russian agent
 Adrienne C. Moore as Rhonda, Carrie's lawyer
 Marin Hinkle as Christine Lonas, a youth care social worker
 F. Murray Abraham as Dar Adal
 Geoff Pierson as Senator Richard Eames, a member of the Senate Intelligence Committee

Episodes

Production
The series was renewed for a seventh and eighth season in August 2016. For this season, Maury Sterling, Jake Weber and Linus Roache were promoted to series regulars; Sterling has been recurring since the first season, while Weber and Roache both first appeared in the sixth season. The seventh season began production on September 11, 2017, filming in Richmond, Virginia. Filming wrapped in Budapest, Hungary on March 29, 2018.

The writers initially planned for the series' seventh and eighth seasons to comprise a two-season arc, but current events surrounding the U.S. government convinced them to instead continue the arc from Season 6 into Season 7.  Showrunner Alex Gansa said "Given the swirl of news about the Administration’s war with its own intelligence community, “It was just hard not to do it.  It was hard to say ‘OK, let’s go tell a story in Paris. Let’s go tell a story in South America.’ Something very significant is happening in all our lives right now”.

Reception

Critical response
The seventh season of Homeland received generally positive reviews from critics, who particularly praised the second half. On Metacritic, the season (based on the first episode only) has a score of 65 out of 100 based on 6 reviews. On Rotten Tomatoes, it has an approval rating of 80% with an average rating of 7.7 out of 10 based on 19 reviews. The site's critical consensus is, "Though it lacks the series' patented agonizing suspense, Homelands seventh season remains an engaging drama by embracing its pulpier elements and pitting Claire Danes' magnetic protagonist against the White House."

Accolades
For the 70th Primetime Emmy Awards, the series received two nominations–Mandy Patinkin for Outstanding Supporting Actor in a Drama Series and F. Murray Abraham for Outstanding Guest Actor in a Drama Series. Alex Gansa won the Writers Guild of America Award for Television: Episodic Drama for "Paean to the People" at the 71st Writers Guild of America Awards.

References

External links

 
 

2018 American television seasons
7